Hurricane is the tenth studio album by singer Grace Jones, released in 2008, and her first album of new material in 19 years. The album includes a number of autobiographical songs, and the title track was first recorded as a 1997 collaboration with Tricky under the title "Cradle to the Grave". The album sold over 100,000 copies in Europe only and three years after the original release, Jones released a dub version of it. Hurricane – Dub came out on 5 September 2011.

Background and production
Grace Jones' previous album, Bulletproof Heart, was released in 1989, and despite several comeback attempts throughout the 1990s, her next full-length record would be released almost two decades later. The singer had decided "never to do an album again", changing her mind only after meeting the music producer Ivor Guest via mutual friend Philip Treacy. After becoming acquainted, Guest played Jones a track he had been working on and she set her lyrics "Devil in My Life" to it. In 2007 Guest announced that he and Jones had completed recording the album, originally rumoured to be titled Corporate Cannibal.

The album includes a number of autobiographical songs, these include "This Is", "Williams' Blood" and "I'm Crying (Mother's Tears)". "Love You to Life" is another track based on real events and "Corporate Cannibal" refers to the subject of corporate capitalism. The title track was first recorded as a 1997 collaboration with Tricky under the title "Cradle to the Grave". "Well Well Well" is dedicated to the memory of Alex Sadkin, who had died in 1987, having co-produced three of Jones' 1980s albums. "Sunset Sunrise" ponders mankind's relationship with nature, and the final song, "Devil in My Life", was written after a party in Venice while Jones was standing in the corner observing partygoers. Four songs were ultimately removed from the track listing: "The Key to Funky" (co-written by Jones and Diane Pernet in the late '80s), "Body Phenomenon", "Sister Sister" and "Misery". Another track recorded by Jones, "Volunteer", was leaked in 2007 by Leslie Winer, together with "This", an early version of "This Is". Winer also asserted that she had written both songs with Joe Galdo in the early 1990s. Mainly with Sly and Robbie, Wally Badarou, Barry Reynolds, Mikey Chung and Uziah "Sticky" Thompson, aka the Compass Point Allstars as a backbone, the album retained the reggae-influenced sound of her three Compass Point albums even though it was not recorded at the studios in the Bahamas.

Hurricanes sound is a singular blend of multiple different genres. AllMusic's Jon O'Brien deemed it "an appropriately titled whirlwind of dub rock, reggae, industrial electro, and trip-hop" According to Daisy Jones of Vice, the record "weaves together dub, electronica, industrial, reggae and gospel music", while The Washington Posts Allison Stewart categorized it as a "set of dancehall and electro-disco tracks".

The front and back covers of the album features pictures of chocolate heads of Jones, which she revealed on Friday Night with Jonathan Ross shortly before Hurricanes release. Photographs included in the booklet picture the singer as a chocolate factory worker, complete with uniform and name tag. Chocolate heads, as well as arms and legs were molded at the Thorntons chocolate factory in Derbyshire, England by lifecasting expert John Schoonraad, his son Tristan and artist Nick Reynolds.

 Singles 
"Corporate Cannibal" became the album's first single, released in August 2008 and promoted at the Meltdown festival. The song did not chart. The second single, "Williams' Blood", was released in December, and subsequently became a charting success in Belgium. A promotional only single, "Well Well Well", was released in 2009. "Love You to Life" was chosen as the third commercial single in 2009, but its release would be postponed for over a year.

 Release and promotion 
Prior to the release, Jones performed a two-hour concert at Massive Attack's Meltdown festival in London on 19 June 2008, during which she performed four new songs from the album and premiered the music video for the first single, "Corporate Cannibal". For further album promotion, Jones appeared on British television talk show Friday Night with Jonathan Ross, several awards galas, and embarked on The Hurricane Tour in January 2009, which garnered positive reviews.

The album was released on Wall of Sound on 3 November 2008, in the United Kingdom. PIAS, the parent company of Wall of Sound, distributed Hurricane worldwide, excluding North America.

Jones dedicated the album to the memory of her father, Bishop Robert W. Jones".

 Critical reception 

Upon release, Hurricane was met with positive reception, obtaining a score of 72 out of 100 on review aggregator Metacritic. Phil Freeman from AllMusic website gave the album three and a half stars out of five and wrote that "Hurricane is possibly Grace Jones' most focused artistic statement and a worthy sequel to her classic early-'80s albums". Susie Goldring from BBC Music gave the album a favorable review and wrote that "the album is beautifully produced - with textures that just make you want to savor and unwrap each track, accompanied by the occasional oddity". Alexis Petridis from The Guardian gave the album a mixed review in which he wrote that even though Jones persona in the 80s seemed she was "trying to convince the world she was from another planet" in the record "you learn a surprising amount about her upbringing" and that after the "thrilling first half" of the album it "suddenly seems to run out of puff, as if exhausted by the effort of trying to keep up with its star". Evelyn McDonnell from Los Angeles Times gave the album four out of four star and wrote that Jones is still "cool" in her fifth decade in the show business and praised Jones collaboration with co-producer Ivor Guest, who "delivers this unquiet storm of a comeback". Anthony Thornton from NME gave the album three and a half stars out of five and wrote that in "revisiting the production of her ’80s records she paradoxically produces something that sounds timeless" even though "it's difficult to suppress the notion that by miring herself in the ’90s, inadvertently she occasionally sounds as dated". The Observer gave the album three out of five stars and said that the "contradictions that made her so compelling are now not so much within the songs as between them, leaving less room to maneuvre" and also that "Hurricane shatters the illusion, and flattens the force of nature known as Grace Jones into something quite humdrum". Eric Henderson from Slant Magazine gave the album four out of five stars and wrote that it become Jones's "autobiographical talking book". In his review for The Village Voice Barry Walters defined the album as "a multitude of instruments dance in orgiastic precision, paying tribute to an icon of pleasurable excesses, for which we now lovingly long".

 Commercial performance 
In 2009. It was awarded a gold certification from the Independent Music Companies Association which indicated sales of at least 100,000 copies throughout Europe.

 Re-release 
Three years after the original Hurricane release, Jones released a dub version of the album. Hurricane – Dub came out on 5 September 2011. The dub versions were made by Ivor Guest, with contributions from Adam Green, Frank Byng, Robert Logan and Ben Cowan.

The dub re-release of Hurricane features new artwork by Jean-Paul Goude of Jones smoking a cigarette whilst wearing a sparkling hat.

Track listing

Original release

Hurricane – Dub

Personnel

 Wally Badarou – keyboards
 Mikey Chung – guitar
 Neil Comber – mix assistance
 Cameron Craig – sound engineering, mix engineering
 Jonathan de Villiers – photography
 Don-E – keyboards, backing vocals
 Sly Dunbar – drum kit, programming
 Brian Eno – production, keyboards, backing vocals
 Richard Flack – sound engineering
 Antony Genn – production, arrangements, keyboards, backing vocals
 Paulo Goude – keyboards, marimba, backing vocals
 Adam Green – guitar
 Ivor Guest – production, programming, mix engineering, arrangements, keyboards
 Ladonna Harley-Peters – backing vocals

 Sharlene Hector – backing vocals
 Tom Hingston – artwork design
 Will Johnstone – sound engineering
 Grace Jones – lead vocals, backing vocals, production
 Bob Ludwig – mastering
 Robert Logan - drones, drum edits
 Steve Pelluet – sound engineering
 Barry Reynolds – guitar
 Leopold Ross – guitar
 Robbie Shakespeare – bass guitar
 Philip Sheppard – arrangements, conducting
 Martin Slattery – piano, organ
 John Justin Stewart – guitar
 Uziah Thompson – percussion
 Bruce Woolley – co-production, keyboards, backing vocals
 Will Worsley – sound engineering

Charts

Release history

The Hurricane TourThe Hurricane Tour was a concert tour by singer Grace Jones to promote her album Hurricane. The tour sold well and received public and critical acclaim.Grace Jones at the Symphony Hall, Birmingham, The Times, 21 January 2009

Setlist
The setlist varied from show to show:

{{hidden
| headercss = background: #ccccff; font-size: 100%; width: 90%;
| contentcss = text-align: left; font-size: 100%; width: 90%;
| header = London first show setlist
| content =Act One "Nightclubbing"
 "This Is"
 "My Jamaican Guy"
 "Sunset Sunrise"
 "Demolition Man"Act Two'
 "I've Seen That Face Before (Libertango)"
 "Love You to Life"
 "La Vie en rose"
 "Well Well Well"
 "Williams' Blood"
 "Devil in My Life"
Act Three
 "Pull Up to the Bumper"
 "Love Is the Drug"
 "Slave to the Rhythm"
Encore
 "Hurricane"
}}

{{hidden
| headercss = background: #ccccff; font-size: 100%; width: 90%;
| contentcss = text-align: left; font-size: 100%; width: 90%;
| header = Second London show's setlist  
| content =
Act One
 "Nightclubbing"
 "Private Life"
 "My Jamaican Guy"
 "This Is"
 "Demolition Man"
Act Two
 "I've Seen That Face Before (Libertango)"
 "Corporate Cannibal"
 "Nipple to the Bottle"
 "I've Done It Again"
 "Love You to Life"
 "La Vie en rose"
Act Three
 "Williams' Blood"
 "Love Is the Drug"
 "Pull Up to the Bumper"
 "Warm Leatherette"
Encore
 "Slave to the Rhythm"
}}

Tour dates

References

External links
 Hurricane on AllMusic
 Hurricane on Discogs
 Hurricane on Rate Your Music

2008 albums
Grace Jones albums
Albums produced by Brian Eno
Wall of Sound (record label) albums
Trip hop albums by Jamaican artists